Maurice Lefèvre (1863-1917) was a Belgian poet, playwright and songwriter. He was a leading figure in Paris around the end of 19th century and start of the 20th century.

Life

Maurice Lefèvre was born in 1863. He became one of the best known artists at Le Chat Noir.
He was co-author with Henri Vuagneux of the ballet/pantomime Scaramouche, with music by André Messager (1853-1929). 
The artist Jules Chéret (1836-1932) created a poster for the opening of the show on 17 October 1891 at the Nouveau-Théâtre at 15, rue Blanche.
The mime Félicia Mallet played a starring role.

Lefèvre admired Mallet and appeared with her at matinées-causeries at La Bodinière.
In these he talked about the chansons brutales which Mallet then sang.
He dedicated his 1893 book À travers chants to Mallet, a book in which he defended the chanson populaire. He was less enthusiastic about other singers.
In an 1896 review Lefèvre describes, without naming her, Yvette Guilbert. He said,

In a 1912 essay in Le Monde artiste Lefevre criticized the excessive cosmopolitanism of Paris, calling for more emphasis on French culture. He said, "We need to do some soul searching, and ask ourselves whether our guests are becoming our masters."
Maurice Lefèvre died in 1917.

Selected works

References
Citations

Sources

1863 births
1917 deaths
Belgian writers in French
French male writers